Millen Township is a civil township of Alcona County in the U.S. state of Michigan. The population was 404 at the 2010 census.

Communities
Most of the community is within the southwest portion of Hawes Township.

Geography

Major highways
 runs along the western border of the township.
 runs east–west through the central portion of the township and intersects with M-65

Demographics
As of the census of 2000, there were 463 people, 202 households, and 139 families residing in the township.  The population density was 6.6 per square mile (2.5/km).  There were 541 housing units at an average density of 7.7 per square mile (3.0/km).  The racial makeup of the township was 96.11% White, 1.94% Native American, 1.08% Asian, 0.22% from other races, and 0.65% from two or more races. Hispanic or Latino of any race were 2.59% of the population.

There were 202 households, out of which 20.3% had children under the age of 18 living with them, 60.4% were married couples living together, 4.0% had a female householder with no husband present, and 30.7% were non-families. 27.7% of all households were made up of individuals, and 13.9% had someone living alone who was 65 years of age or older.  The average household size was 2.24 and the average family size was 2.65.

In the township the population was spread out, with 19.2% under the age of 18, 5.0% from 18 to 24, 19.0% from 25 to 44, 32.0% from 45 to 64, and 24.8% who were 65 years of age or older.  The median age was 50 years. For every 100 females, there were 104.9 males.  For every 100 females age 18 and over, there were 107.8 males.

The median income for a household in the township was $26,932, and the median income for a family was $33,077. Males had a median income of $28,250 versus $18,125 for females. The per capita income for the township was $14,475.  About 14.5% of families and 21.4% of the population were below the poverty line, including 29.3% of those under age 18 and 5.2% of those age 65 or over.

Education
Millen Township is served entirely by Alcona Community Schools.

References

External links
Millen Township official website

Townships in Alcona County, Michigan
Townships in Michigan